Sellerich is a municipality in the district of Bitburg-Prüm, in Rhineland-Palatinate, western Germany.

With a predominantly agricultural structure, Sellerich consists of the districts Sellerich, Hontheim, Herscheid, Sellericher-Höhe and  Schneifelhaus.

References

External links
 www.sellerich.de Website of tourist association 

Bitburg-Prüm